Everything's Relative is an American sitcom television series that aired on NBC from April 6, 1999 until April 27, 1999. The series was created by Mitchell Hurwitz, and was produced by Witt/Thomas Productions in association with Warner Bros. Television.

Premise
This sitcom revolves around a young comedy writer and his family.

Cast
Kevin Rahm as Leo Gorelick
Jeffrey Tambor as Jake Gorelick
Eric Schaeffer as Marty Gorelick
Jill Clayburgh as Mickey Gorelick
Maureen Cassidy as Trina

Episodes

References

External links

1999 American television series debuts
1999 American television series endings
1990s American sitcoms
English-language television shows
NBC original programming
Television series by Universal Television
Television series by Warner Bros. Television Studios
Television shows set in Los Angeles
Television series created by Mitchell Hurwitz